The spectacled tyrannulet (Zimmerius improbus), also known as specious tyrannulet or mountain tyrannulet, is a small passerine bird in the tyrant flycatcher family. It occurs in Venezuela and Colombia.

The spectacled tyrannulet was described in 1871 by the English naturalists Philip Sclater and Osbert Salvin under the binomial name Tyranniscus improbus. It was formerly considered to be conspecific with the Guatemalan tyrannulet (Zimmerius vilissimus).

There are two subspecies:
 Zimmerius improbus tamae (Phelps & Phelps Jr, 1954) – Sierra Nevada de Santa Marta in northeast Colombia
 Zimmerius improbus improbus (Sclater, PL & Salvin, 1871) – Serranía del Perijá in northeast Colombia and northwest Venezuela

References

spectacled tyrannulet
Birds of Colombia
Birds of Venezuela
spectacled tyrannulet
spectacled tyrannulet
spectacled tyrannulet